Phila of Thebes (Greek: Φίλα) was a courtesan in antiquity. She was enslaved at the Siege of Thebes in 335 BC and ransomed by rhetor Hyperides, who installed her at his house in Eleusis.

References
Who's who in the age of Alexander the Great: prosopography of Alexander's empire by Waldemar Heckel 
The courtesan's arts by Martha Feldman, Bonnie Gordon, 2006, p. 42 

Ancient Thebans
Hetairai
4th-century BC Greek women
Ancient Greek slaves and freedmen